Walter Lowrie (December 10, 1784December 14, 1868) was a teacher, farmer, and politician from Butler County, Pennsylvania. He served in both houses in the state legislature and represented Pennsylvania in the United States Senate. Serving as chairman of the Committee on Finance during the 2nd session of the 17th Congress.

After his term as a Senator, Lowrie stayed on as secretary of the Senate for eleven years. In 1836 he moved to New York City and went to work with the Missionary Board of the Presbyterian Church. He remained with them until his death. Three of his sons, John Cameron, Walter Macon, and Reuben, were prominent as missionaries to India and China. A nephew, Walter H. Lowrie, later served as chief justice of Pennsylvania's Supreme Court.

Lowrie died in New York City on December 14, 1868 and is interred in the First Presbyterian Church in Manhattan.

See also
 List of United States senators born outside the United States

External links

1784 births
1868 deaths
Politicians from Edinburgh
Scottish emigrants to the United States
Secretaries of the United States Senate
Members of the Pennsylvania House of Representatives
Pennsylvania state senators
United States senators from Pennsylvania
Pennsylvania Democratic-Republicans
Democratic-Republican Party United States senators
19th-century American politicians